Qiu Xuejun (born January 1967) is a Chinese diplomat and government officer. He is Deputy Director-General of the Department of Consular Affairs of the Chinese Foreign Ministry. He is also Director of the Center for Consular Assistance and Protection.

He was admitted to the major of English Language and Literature of Beijing International Studies University in 1985.
Before assuming the office, he served successively as Deputy Consul General in San Francisco, USA from 2002 to 2005,
and Counsellor and Consul General of the Chinese Embassy in the United States from 2005 to 2007.

Since  he is ambassador in Windhoek.

References

1967 births
Living people
Beijing International Studies University people
Ambassadors of China
Ambassadors to Eritrea